National Honey Bee Day (formerly National Honey Bee Awareness Day) is an awareness day when beekeepers, beekeeping clubs and associations, and honey bee enthusiasts from across the United States celebrate honey bees and recognize their contribution to humans' everyday lives as a means of protecting this critical species. National Honey Bee Day also pays homage to beekeepers, whose labors ensure there are  well-managed, healthy bees to pollinate crops.

According to its organizers, the National Honey Bee Day program started with a simple concept:

The event was started in 2009 by a small group of beekeepers who petitioned for and obtained a formal proclamation by the USDA honoring honey bees and beekeeping. In 2010, a non-profit, Pennsylvania Apiculture Inc. was organized to facilitate and promote the observance better. The original observation date was August 22, 2009 (the fourth Saturday of August), but since then, it has settled permanently on the third Saturday of August.

National Honey Bee Day is managed by HoneyLove.org, a Los Angeles-based honey bee educational non-profit.

References

External links
 World Honey Bee Day
 North Central Florida Beekeepers Association National Honey Bee Day Event
http://www.nationalhoneybeeday.com
http://honeylove.org

Awareness days
Beekeeping
Saturday observances 
August observances
Holidays and observances by scheduling (nth weekday of the month)